Thakur Village is a densely populated residential locality in Kandivali, Mumbai, India. It is located to the east of the Western Express Highway, which is part of the National Highway 8.

Connectivity
The area boasts excellent internal and external connectivity. It is located on the busy Western Express Highway, which becomes NH 8 (Mumbai-Ahmedabad) outside Mumbai city limits. There are two approaches from the highway: one at the Mahindra and Mahindra junction, and the other at Magathane Telephone Exchange. Both approaches have flyovers and underpasses which makes entry and exit very easy.

It is equidistant from Kandivali and Borivali railway stations which fall on the Western Railway's suburban section. Almost all outstation trains on the Western Railway stop at Borivali.

The domestic and international airports can also be reached quickly due to the proximity to the highway. Mumbai-Pune Shivneri Volvo buses operated by MSRTC can also be boarded from the nearby Sukurwadi or Nancy Colony bus depots.

The area is well serviced by the public transport buses operated by BEST. Route 287 connects the area to Kandivali station and routes 209, 629 and 703 to Borivali station. Route 223 is a fairly long-distance route that runs along the Link Road and connects to the business hub of Mindspace and the Bollywood hub of Andheri Lokhandwala.

Air-conditioned buses operated by BEST and NMMT provide direct connectivity to the business districts like NKP (Nirlon Knowledge Park, Goregaon), SEEPZ, Hiranandani-Harsh Mulchandani (Powai), BKC (Bandra Kurla Complex), Worli, Cuffe Parade, Backbay, MBP (Millennium Business Park, Airoli), and CBD Belapur.

Internally, a 120-foot wide cement-concrete (CC) road acts as the traffic backbone of the area. Besides this, the area is well serviced by a network of inter-connected roads, cross-roads and lanes.

From 10 July 2013, MSRTC has started the Shivneri Corporate bus service from Thakur Village to BKC. The promotional fare is priced at Rs. 100.

Community newspaper
Neighbourhood Times, Kandivali East's weekly community newspaper, was launched on 17 February 2011. It covers local issues, events and news.

Medical 
Suburban Diagnostics, a large diagnostic center, is located opposite Thakur College with multiple facilities. 
Sarodev Orthopaedic Hospital and Rehabilitation Centre is an orthopaedic hospital located in the nearby Thakur Complex. Ayurvedic Treatments like Panchkarma are available at clinics in the vicinity like Spandan Ayurved. Many Ayurvedic medicine stores are also in the area.

Sports
There are a number of gardens, sports grounds, and play parks in Thakur Village, which include Evershine Dream Park, Thakur Jogger's Park, Lucky Jogger's Park, Viceroy Jogger's Park, Evershine Jogger's Park, Thakur Cricket Ground and Stadium and Thakur Engineering College Ground.

Education
The area is an education hub and is known for a number of educational institutions located here, mostly founded by the Thakur Educational Group. These institutions include Thakur College of Science and Commerce, founded in 1992; Thakur Vidya Mandir And High School, founded in 1990; Thakur College of Engineering and Technology, founded in 2001; Thakur Institute of Management Studies and Research, founded in 2002; Thakur Public School, and Thakur Shyamnarayan School.

The other schools located in Thakur Village are the Oxford Public School, Gundecha Education Academy and Chatrabhuj Narsee School. There is also a BMC funded public school.

See also
 Magathane (Vidhan Sabha constituency)

References

Suburbs of Mumbai
Neighbourhoods in Maharashtra